Lorena Bogza (born 23 April 1971, Piatra Neamț) is a journalist from the Republic of Moldova. She has been working for PRO TV since 1996.

Awards 
 Order of the Republic (Moldova) – highest state distinction (2009)

References

External links 
 Blog despre Lorena Bogza
 Pagina de prezentare ProTV Chișinău

1971 births
Living people
Romanian journalists
Romanian women journalists
Moldovan journalists
Eastern Orthodox Christians from Romania
People from Piatra Neamț
Moldovan women television presenters
Romanian women television presenters
Romanian people of Moldovan descent
Recipients of the Order of the Republic (Moldova)
Moldovan television presenters
Moldovan philologists
Romanian philologists
Women philologists